Prostanthera eckersleyana, commonly known as crinkly mintbush, is a species of flowering plant in the family Lamiaceae and is endemic to the south-west of Western Australia. It is an erect or spreading shrub with sticky, hairy branchlets, egg-shaped to elliptical leaves and blue, mauve to purple or violet flowers with maroon spots inside the petal tube.

Description
Flowering occurs from May to July or December.

Taxonomy
Prostanthera eckersleyana was first formally described in 1876 by Ferdinand von Mueller in his book Fragmenta phytographiae Australiae. The specific epithet (eckersleyana) honours Florence Eckersley.

Distribution and habitat
This mintbush grows on plains, often with Melaleuca and Acacia species and occurs in the Avon Wheatbelt, Coolgardie and Yalgoo biographic regions of Western Australia.

Conservation status
Prostanthera eckersleyana is classified as "not threatened" by the Western Australian Government Department of Parks and Wildlife.

References

eckersleyana
Flora of Western Australia
Lamiales of Australia
Taxa named by Ferdinand von Mueller
Plants described in 1876